Norma Glasgo Reid, Lady Birley (born 28 April 1952 in Limavady, Northern Ireland) was Vice-Chancellor and Principal of the University of the Witwatersrand. A statistician, and health service researcher, she has also held the positions of director of an academic consultancy firm, Associate Professor of the University of Ulster, and an Honorary Professor of Sussex University. She was appointed to Witwatersrand in 2000, following a 25-year career as a researcher, teacher and senior administrator in higher education.

Education 
Birley was educated at Limavady Grammar School, in Northern Ireland, and obtained a BSc and a MSc in mathematics at Sussex University, graduating in 1974. She was awarded a D. Phil by the University of Ulster in 1983 and was made an honorary Doctor of Science Sussex University in 2002.

Early appointments and research
In 1974, Birley was appointed to the DHSS Health Services Research Unit at the University of Newcastle-upon-Tyne. In 1977 she was appointed lecturer in statistics at the London School of Economics. She became interested in pedagogy as a result of being asked to teach a Master's class of sociologists, in finding new graphical ways to communicate her subject to a reluctant audience. 

In 1978, she returned to Northern Ireland, to lead an interdisciplinary study of nurse education in the clinical setting at the University of Ulster. In 1984, she became founding Director of that university's Research Centre for Applied Health Studies, and in 1986 she was promoted to a senior lectureship in mathematics. While there, she published the first evidence of the huge exodus of well-qualified school leavers from Ulster in those years.

She was awarded a D Phil by the University of Ulster in 1983; her thesis was a statistical investigation of the relationship between the quality of nurse education in the clinical setting, and the historically used apprenticeship model of nurse education. She sat on the Royal College of Nursing's Commission on Nursing Education (1985), and wrote a chapter in their report on nurse education.

In 1988, she was appointed to Coventry University as Head of Department and Professor of Health Sciences in the first interdisciplinary Department of Health Sciences in the UK, comprising physiotherapy, occupational therapy and nursing. She was promoted to Dean of the Faculty of Social, Biological and Health Sciences in 1991. During these years, she published three books, two of which became standard text books in research methods for nurses, and continued to sell well over two decades. She also published some 70 articles in refereed journals.

Educational management 

Birley was appointed Pro-Vice-Chancellor of Coventry University in 1993, with responsibility for academic development. She was appointed as a Quality Auditor of the national Quality Assurance Agency, in 1996, Deputy Vice-Chancellor at Plymouth University, with responsibility for finance, estates, IT and human resources, and in 2000, Deputy Vice-Chancellor for Corporate Development. In these years, she played a leading role in the establishment of the Peninsula Medical School. 

In 2001, Birley was appointed as Vice-Chancellor and Principal of the University of the Witwatersrand in Johannesburg, South Africa, the first woman and only the fourth foreigner to hold the position in its 100-year history. In post-1994 South Africa, her appointment was controversial as a female white foreigner – especially in a university which had a turbulent history of internal and external political friction—her predecessor had resigned very early in his appointment, as had two previous Deputy Vice-chancellors.

During her time there, student numbers and external funding reached record levels. She led the establishment of a cultural precinct and raised £2.5 million to found a Rock Art Museum, which was opened as the Origins Centre in 2006. After the death of her husband, Sir Derek Birley, in May 2002, she faced renewed challenges to her leadership, led by the Chair of the University Council, and resigned in November 2002. She sued the university for libel, receiving an out-of-court settlement of R1.1 million in 2004.

In 2003–04, Lady Birley led the development of an econometric/statistical model  for the South Africa Department of Labour to predict the financial and human resources impact of HIV/AIDS on major South African companies.

On her return to the UK, she became Director of the Institute for Research in Health and Human Sciences at Thames Valley University, and subsequently, its Director for Postgraduate Development. Since then she has been director of NRB Consulting, a consultancy company in health and social services.

References

External links 

Mathematicians from Northern Ireland
1952 births
Living people
People from Limavady
People educated at Limavady Grammar School
Alumni of the University of Sussex
Alumni of Ulster University
Academics of Newcastle University
Academics of the London School of Economics
Academics of Coventry University
Academic staff of the University of the Witwatersrand
Academics of the University of Plymouth
Academics of the University of West London
Wives of knights